Scrobipalpa phagnalella is a moth in the family Gelechiidae. It was described by Alexandre Constant in 1895. It is found on Corsica, Sardinia, Crete, in Portugal, Spain, southern France, Greece, Russia and Morocco.

The larvae feed on Phagnalon saxatile and Phagnalon rupestre.

References

Scrobipalpa
Moths described in 1895